Nəmirli or Namirli or Namarly or Namirly or Namerli may refer to:
Nəmirli, Agdam, Azerbaijan
Nəmirli, Agsu, Azerbaijan
Nəmirli, Yevlakh, Azerbaijan